Kylen Granson (born March 27, 1998) is an American football tight end for the Indianapolis Colts of the National Football League (NFL). He played college football at Rice and SMU before being drafted by the Colts in the fourth round of the 2021 NFL Draft.

Early years
Granson was born in DeMotte, Indiana, and grew up in Austin, Texas, where he attended Westlake High School. Granson was named second-team All-District 14-6A as a senior. He was not heavily recruited and committed to play college football at Rice over an offer from Harvard.

College career
Granson began his collegiate career playing wide receiver for the Rice Owls. As a freshman he caught 33 passes for 381 yards and two touchdowns followed by 18 receptions for 241 yards in his sophomore season. Granson left the program following the firing of Rice head coach David Bailiff and enrolled at Austin Community College, hoping to join the Texas Longhorns as a walk-on. Granson had a chance encounter with Bailiff on the University of Texas campus, who did not know that he had left Rice and began contacting college coaches on Granson's behalf. SMU coach Sonny Dykes offered Granson a spot as a walk-on.

Granson sat out his first season at SMU per NCAA transfer rules and was awarded a scholarship. As a redshirt junior, he caught 43 passes for 721 yards and nine touchdowns and was named second-team All-American Athletic Conference (AAC). He was named first-team All-AAC after finishing his redshirt senior season with 35 receptions for 536 yards and five touchdowns. Granson's 14 touchdown receptions set a new school record for tight ends.

Professional career

Granson was selected by the Indianapolis Colts in the fourth round with the 127th overall pick in the 2021 NFL Draft. He signed his four-year rookie contract with Indianapolis on May 19, 2021.

References

External links
Rice Owls bio
SMU Mustangs bio

1998 births
American football tight ends
Living people
Players of American football from Austin, Texas
Rice Owls football players
SMU Mustangs football players
Indianapolis Colts players